Satam Muhammed Abdel Rahman al-Suqami (June 28, 1976 – September 11, 2001) was a Saudi law student and one of five hijackers of American Airlines Flight 11 as part of the September 11 attacks in 2001.

Al-Suqami had been a law student until he was recruited into al-Qaeda along with Majed Moqed, another hijacker, and traveled to Afghanistan where he would be chosen to participate in the 9/11 attacks.

He arrived in the United States in April 2001. On September 11, 2001, al-Suqami boarded American Airlines Flight 11 and participated in the hijacking of the plane so that it could be crashed into the North Tower of the World Trade Center as part of the coordinated attacks. He died along with all other people on the flight.

Early life

A native of the Saudi Arabian city of Riyadh, al-Suqami was a law student at the King Saud University. While there he joined a (possible) former roommate named Majed Moqed in training for Al-Qaida at Khalden, a large training facility near Kabul that was run by Ibn al-Shaykh al-Libi. In November 2000, the two flew into Iran from Bahrain together.

Career
 
The FBI says al-Suqami first arrived in the United States on April 23, 2001, with a visa that allowed him to remain in the country until May 21.  However, at least five residents of the Spanish Trace Apartments claim to recognize the photographs of both al-Suqami and Salem al-Hazmi, the younger brother of 9/11 hijacker Nawaf al-Hazmi, as living in the San Antonio complex earlier in 2001. However, these residents and several others who claim to have known the hijackers, claim that the FBI photographs of al-Suqami and al-Hazmi are reversed. Other reports conflictingly suggested that al-Suqami was staying with Waleed al-Shehri in Hollywood, Florida and rented a black Toyota Corolla from Alamo Rent-A-Car agency.

On May 19, al-Suqami and Waleed al-Shehri took a flight from Fort Lauderdale to Freeport, Bahamas where they had reservations at the Princess Resort.  Lacking proper documentation however, they were stopped upon landing, and returned to Florida the same day and rented a red Kia Rio from a Avis Car Rental agency.

He was one of nine hijackers to open a SunTrust bank account with a cash deposit around June 2001, and on July 3 he was issued a Florida State Identification Card. Around this time, he also used his Saudi license to gain a Florida drivers' license bearing the same home address as Wail al-Shehri. (A Homing Inn in Boynton Beach).  Despite this, the 9/11 Commission claims that al-Suqami was the only hijacker to not have any US identification.

During the summer, al-Suqami and brothers Wail and Waleed al-Shehri purchased one month passes to a Boynton Beach gym owned by Jim Woolard. (Mohamed Atta and Marwan al-Shehhi also reportedly trained at a gym owned by Woolard, in Delray Beach.)

Known as Azmi during the preparations, al-Suqami was called one of the "muscle" hijackers, who were not expected to act as pilots. CIA director George Tenet later said that they "probably were told little more than that they were headed for a suicide mission inside the United States."

September 11 attacks and death

On September 10, 2001, al-Suqami shared a room at the Milner Hotel in Boston with three of the Flight 175 hijackers, Marwan al-Shehhi, Fayez Banihammad, and Mohand al-Shehri.

On the day of the attacks, al-Suqami checked in at the flight desk using his Saudi passport, and boarded American Airlines Flight 11.  At Logan International Airport, he was selected by CAPPS, which required his checked bags to undergo extra screening for explosives and involved no extra screening at the passenger security checkpoint.

An FAA memo, circulated in February 2002, claimed that al-Suqami shot passenger Daniel M. Lewin (Seat 9B), co-founder of Akamai Technologies and a former member of the Israeli Sayeret Matkal. While based on the frantic phone call received from a stewardess of the flight, the report has been a matter of some controversy, since both the FAA and FBI have strongly denied the presence of firearms or guns smuggled aboard. In 2004, further analysis of flight attendant Betty Ong’s phone call to American Airlines reservations confirmed that al-Suqami slashed the throat of Lewin; however, it is unclear whether Lewin was stabbed as a result of him attempting to intervene in the hijacking, or because Lewin was seated directly in front of al-Suqami, he was stabbed to frighten other passengers and crew into compliance.

Passport discovery
The passport of al-Suqami was found by a passerby in the vicinity of Vesey Street, before the towers collapsed. (This was mistakenly reported by many news outlets to be Mohamed Atta's passport.) A columnist for the British newspaper The Guardian expressed incredulity about the authenticity of this report, questioning whether a paper passport could survive the inferno unsinged when the black boxes of the plane were never found. According to testimony before the 9/11 Commission by lead counsel Susan Ginsburg, his passport had been "manipulated in a fraudulent manner in ways that have been associated with al Qaeda." Passports belonging to Ziad Jarrah and Saeed al-Ghamdi were found at the crash site of United Airlines Flight 93 as well as an airphone.

See also 
 PENTTBOM
 Hijackers in the September 11 attacks

References

External links 
 The Final 9/11 Commission Report

American Airlines Flight 11
1976 births
2001 deaths
Participants in the September 11 attacks
People from Riyadh
Saudi Arabian emigrants to the United States
Saudi Arabian al-Qaeda members
Saudi Arabian Islamists
King Saud University alumni
Saudi Arabian mass murderers